Hoërskool Delmas is a public, tuition-charging, Afrikaans and English language high school located in Delmas, Mpumalanga, South Africa.  As of 2014 it had approximately 670 students. Two hostels are located on the premises.

History
The first grade 11 class began in January 1953 and the first matrics was written in December 1954. On 4 February 1956  the corner stone with the text written: “Daar op die rooi bult" was laid. The school grew to about 539 students in 1979 and were the host of their first inter high in 1980.

Activities

Sport 
Athletics
Cricket
Cross Country Running
Golf
Hockey
Netball
Rugby
Tennis

References

External links
Official school website

High schools in Mpumalanga
Educational institutions established in 1953
1935 establishments in South Africa